= Y2K: How the 2000s Became Everything =

2025 essay collection by Colette Shade

- Author: Colette Shade
- Language: English
- Publisher: HarperCollins
- Publication date: January 7, 2025
- Publication place: United States
- Media type: Book
- Pages: 256
- ISBN: 9780063333949

Y2K: How the 2000s Became Everything is a 2025 collection of essays by Colette Shade that examines American culture from the dot-com era of the mid-1990s to the 2008 subprime mortgage crisis.
